The Asia/Oceania Zone was one of the three zones of the regional Davis Cup competition in 1996.

In the Asia/Oceania Zone there were three different tiers, called groups, in which teams compete against each other to advance to the upper tier. Winners in Group II advanced to the Asia/Oceania Zone Group I. Teams who lost their respective ties competed in the relegation play-offs, with winning teams remaining in Group II, whereas teams who lost their play-offs were relegated to the Asia/Oceania Zone Group III in 1997.

Participating nations

Draw

 and  relegated to Group III in 1997.
 promoted to Group I in 1997.

First round

Hong Kong vs. Sri Lanka

Thailand vs. Iran

Pakistan vs. Saudi Arabia

Bahrain vs. Uzbekistan

Second round

Thailand vs. Hong Kong

Pakistan vs. Uzbekistan

Relegation play-offs

Iran vs. Sri Lanka

Saudi Arabia vs. Bahrain

Third round

Uzbekistan vs. Thailand

References

External links
Davis Cup official website

Davis Cup Asia/Oceania Zone
Asia Oceania Zone Group II